Brady Feigl refers to two baseball players who share remarkable coincidences with each other.

Both men not only share the same name, but look similar to one another, as well as being the same height as each other, at 6 feet 4 inches. Both men had never met another person with their surname. They are both pitchers for their respective teams, and have had Tommy John surgery performed by the same doctor. When meeting each other, they took a DNA test to see if they were related to one another. Despite their near identical appearance, they were not related, however by another coincidence, both Feigls had 53% German ancestry.

Brady Matthew Feigl

Brady Matthew Feigl (born December 27, 1990) is an American professional baseball left-handed relief pitcher for the Long Island Ducks of the Atlantic League of Professional Baseball.

Feigl attended Old Mill High School in Millersville, Maryland. Feigl played college baseball at Mount St. Mary's University from 2009 to 2012. He missed his junior year in 2011 due to a torn labrum.

Atlanta Braves
A year after graduating college, Feigl signed with the Atlanta Braves as an undrafted free agent in October 2013 after he impressed a Braves scout at Mount St. Mary's Scout Day. Feigl was signed that year as a free agent by Braves' scout Gene Kerns. He made his professional debut in 2014 with the Rome Braves and after pitching to a 3.50 ERA in  innings, was promoted to the Lynchburg Hillcats where he went 3–2 with a 2.05 ERA in 22 innings.

In 2015, the Braves invited Feigl to spring training, where he competed for a spot on the opening day roster. Though he spent most of spring training in minor league camp, Feigl was viewed as having a good chance of making the team, due to the release of James Russell. Feigl instead began the 2015 season with the Gwinnett Braves, where he injured his elbow in his Triple–A debut against the Durham Bulls on April 10. Eleven days later, Feigl underwent Tommy John surgery, performed by James Andrews, causing him to miss all of the 2015 season. He pitched in only six games in 2016, three with the GCL Braves and three with the Danville Braves.

Texas Rangers

On December 8, 2016, the Braves traded Feigl and Tyrell Jenkins to the Texas Rangers for Luke Jackson. In 2017, he began the season with the Down East Wood Ducks and was later promoted to the Frisco RoughRiders, posting a combined 4–1 record and 3.81 ERA in 59 innings pitched between both teams. In 2018 Feigl split the season between Frisco and the Round Rock Express, posting a combined 6–1 record, 1.53 ERA, with 37 strikeouts in  innings pitched. Feigl received a non-roster invitation to 2019 major-league spring training and was assigned to the Nashville Sounds of the Triple-A Pacific Coast League for the 2019 season. He went 2–0 with a 3.13 ERA in just 23 innings between Nashville and the AZL Rangers, due to non-disclosed injuries.

San Diego Padres
On December 12, 2019, Feigl was selected by the San Diego Padres in the minor league phase of the 2019 Rule 5 draft. Feigl did not play in a game in 2020 due to the cancellation of the minor league season because of the COVID-19 pandemic. Feigl did not appear for a Padres affiliate in 2021 due to injury and elected free agency on November 7, 2021 without having appeared in a game for the Padres organization.

Long Island Ducks
On March 17, 2022, B. M. Feigl signed with the Long Island Ducks of the Atlantic League of Professional Baseball.

Brady Gregory Feigl 

Brady Gregory Feigl (born November 27, 1995) has played in the Oakland Athletics organization, and currently plays for Oakland's Triple-A affiliate, the Las Vegas Aviators. He graduated from Parkway Central High School in Chesterfield, Missouri and played for the Ole Miss Rebels baseball team. Like the other Brady Feigl, he had Tommy John surgery in 2015, also performed by James Andrews.

References

External links

Mount St. Mary's Mountaineers bio

1990 births
Living people
Mount St. Mary's Mountaineers baseball players
Baseball pitchers
Minor league baseball players
Rome Braves players
Lynchburg Hillcats players
Gwinnett Braves players
Gulf Coast Braves players
Danville Braves players
Down East Wood Ducks players
Frisco RoughRiders players
Round Rock Express players
Nashville Sounds players
Arizona League Rangers players
Gigantes del Cibao players
Long Island Ducks players